Edmund B. West (c. 1804February 3, 1854) was an American dentist, physician, surgeon, and Wisconsin pioneer.  He was one of the first dentists in the Wisconsin Territory, and went on to serve one year in the Wisconsin State Senate, representing Waukesha County.

Biography
Edmund B. West was born in Pennsylvania, likely in 1804 (during his term in the Wisconsin State Senate, he was noted as being the eldest member of the Senate at age 47, as of January 1852).  He was educated at the University of Pennsylvania in Philadelphia, and worked as a physician in Wyoming County, Pennsylvania, from 1825 until 1841.  While residing in Wyoming County, he was active in politics as a leader of the local chapter of the Anti-Masonic Party, a forerunner of the Whig Party.

He arrived in the city of Milwaukee around 1843 and began operating as a dentist and dental surgeon.  At the time, he was one of the first professional dentists operating in the Wisconsin Territory.  Around 1847, he moved west to the town of Waukesha, where he operated as a general physician and surgeon.

Dr. West was first referenced in Wisconsin's political affairs in 1848, when he wrote as an advocate for Waukesha County physicians about what they saw as overly onerous state rules regarding the medical practice in the new state.  In 1850, he was the Whig Party's nominee for Wisconsin State Assembly in Waukesha County's 4th State Assembly district (Waukesha and New Berlin).  He was defeated by Democrat William A. Cone in that general election.

A year later, State Senator George Hyer announced his resignation from the Senate in the middle of his term.  Dr. West was selected as the Whig nominee for the January 1852 special election; the Free Soil Party, satisfied with his state position opposing the expansion of slavery and opposing the Fugitive Slave Act of 1850, chose to endorse his candidacy rather than running their own candidate.  West won a narrow victory over Democrat William H. Thomas, in what was then a fairly reliable Democratic district, and represented Waukesha County in the Wisconsin State Senate for the 5th Wisconsin Legislature.

The status of the Wisconsin Supreme Court was a considered issue during the 1852 legislative session, as corruption charges had been brought to the Legislature by attorney Edward G. Ryan—who would become a member of the court 20 years later.  Dr. West was assigned to a three-member committee to investigate, but found no merit to the charges.  Nevertheless, shortly thereafter, the Legislature voted to abolish the current Supreme Court—which was simply composed of the state circuit court judges—and establish a new three-member Supreme Court to be elected by statewide popular vote.

1852 also saw the incorporation of the Village of Waukesha and the first election of village officers.  West was a candidate for Village President in the first election that summer, but fell 7 votes short of Nelson Burrows.

The 1852 Legislature also performed the first legislative redistricting of the state, and Waukesha County was subsequently divided into two Senate districts as the State Senate expanded from 19 members to 25.  West ran for a full term in the new 10th Senate district, which covered the southern half of Waukesha County.  This time, the Free Soil Party ran their own candidate in the race, Reverend Henry H. Van Amringe.  In the three-way race, Dr. West came in a distant 3rd, with the Democrat, Marvin H. Bovee, winning the seat.

Dr. West died one year after leaving office, on February 3, 1854, at his residence in Waukesha, after an illness of several months.

Electoral history

Wisconsin Assembly (1850)

| colspan="6" style="text-align:center;background-color: #e9e9e9;"| General Election, November 5, 1850

Wisconsin Senate, 13th district (1852)

| colspan="6" style="text-align:center;background-color: #e9e9e9;"| Special Election, January 7, 1852

Waukesha Village President (1852)

| colspan="6" style="text-align:center;background-color: #e9e9e9;"| Charter Election, June 30, 1852

Wisconsin Senate, 10th district (1852)

| colspan="6" style="text-align:center;background-color: #e9e9e9;"| General Election, November 2, 1852

References

Date of birth unknown
1804 births
1854 deaths
Wisconsin state senators
Wisconsin Whigs
Anti-Masonic Party politicians from Pennsylvania
University of Pennsylvania alumni
19th-century American politicians
Physicians from Wisconsin
American dentists
Politicians from Waukesha, Wisconsin